Alexander Cattanach (9 June 1895 – 19 January 1977) was a Scottish architect, prominent in the first half of the 20th century. His designs were mostly for cinemas.

He was the son of fellow architect Alexander Cattanach Sr.

Early life
Mackenzie was born on 9 June 1895, one of Alexander Senior's five sons.

He was educated at Kingussie School and Glasgow School of Art, though his time at the latter was interrupted by World War I. He served with the Queen's Own Cameron Highlanders during the conflict. He also served with them during World War II, being promoted to Colonel in the process.

Career
Cattanach took over his father's practice around 1928, when Cattanach Senior fell ill.

Selected notable works
Perth Playhouse, Perth (1933)
Kirkwall Power Station, Kirkwall (after 1945)

Personal life
Cattanach was married to Grace Ann McDougall Hood. She died on 12 December 1976, and Cattanach followed her a few weeks into the new year, aged 81.

References

1895 births
1977 deaths
20th-century Scottish architects
People from Kingussie
Alumni of the Glasgow School of Art